The Wisconsin Supreme Court is the highest appellate court in Wisconsin. The Supreme Court has jurisdiction over original actions, appeals from lower courts, and regulation or administration of the practice of law in Wisconsin.

Location

The Wisconsin Supreme Court normally sits in its main hearing room in the East Wing of the Wisconsin State Capitol building in Madison, Wisconsin. Since 1993, the court has also travelled, once or twice a year, to another part of the state to hear several cases as part of its "Justice on Wheels" program. The purpose of this program is to give the people of Wisconsin a better opportunity to understand the operations of the state supreme court and the court system.

Justices
The court is composed of seven justices who are elected in statewide, non-partisan elections. Each justice is elected for a ten-year term. Importantly, only one justice may be elected in any year. This avoids the sudden shifts in jurisprudence commonly seen in other state supreme courts, where the court composition can be radically shifted if two or three justices are simultaneously targeted for an electoral challenge based on their views on controversial issues. In the event of a vacancy on the court, the governor has the power to appoint an individual to the vacancy, but that justice must then stand for election in the first year in which no other justice's term expires.

After passage of a referendum on April 7, 2015, the chief justice of the court is elected for a term of 2 years by the vote of a majority of the justices then serving on the court, although the justice so elected may decline the appointment. Previous to the change, the justice with the longest continuous service on the court served as the chief justice. Opponents of the referendum called it an attempt to remove longtime Chief Justice Shirley Abrahamson, a member of the court's liberal minority, while supporters called it an effort to promote democracy on the court.

Current justices

Controversies

Recusal
In 2009, the United States Supreme Court decided Caperton v. A.T. Massey Coal Co., holding 5–4 that a campaign expenditure of over $3 million by a corporate litigant to influence the election of a judge to the court that would hear its case, although legal, was an "extreme fact" that created a "probability of bias", thus requiring the judge to be recused from hearing the case. Wisconsin had adopted a limit of $1,000 for campaign contributions to judges, but it was unclear when mandatory recusal was required.  The League of Women Voters petitioned the Court to require a judge to recuse himself or herself from a proceeding if the judge had received any campaign contributions from a party or entity involved in it.  Instead, during its 2009–2010 term and by a 4–3 vote, the Court adopted a rule that recusal is not required based solely on any endorsement or receipt of a lawful campaign contribution from a party or entity involved in the proceeding, and that a judge does not need to seek recusal where it would be based solely on a party in the case sponsoring an independent expenditure or issue advocacy communication in favor of the judge. Voting in favor of the new rule were Prosser, Gableman, Roggensack, and Ziegler. Voting against were Abrahamson, Crooks, and A. Bradley. In the opinion of Justice Roggensack, "when a judge is disqualified from participation, the votes of all who voted to elect that judge are cancelled for all issues presented by that case. Accordingly, recusal rules . . . must be narrowly tailored to meet a compelling state interest." In dissenting, Justice A. Bradley called the decision "a dramatic change to our judicial code of ethics" and took issue with the majority's decision to adopt a rule "proposed by special interest groups."

Confrontation 
On June 13, 2011, a confrontation between Justices David Prosser, Jr. and Ann Walsh Bradley occurred in Bradley's chambers. Prosser, Bradley, and the other justices (except N. Patrick Crooks) were discussing the following day's decision that would overturn a ruling blocking the Wisconsin collective bargaining law. Witnesses stated that the incident happened after Prosser had stated that he'd lost all confidence in the leadership of Chief Justice Shirley Abrahamson. Bradley later accused Prosser of putting her in a chokehold.  Prosser denied the allegations and asked for "a proper review of the matter and the facts surrounding it". The incident was investigated by the Dane County Sheriff's Office. Witnesses to the incident disagreed about what had happened and neither Prosser nor Bradley was charged by a special prosecutor.  Ethics charges brought against Prosser based on Bradley's allegations were never adjudicated due to the lack of a quorum on the Court after recusals.

Campaign expense 
Although elections to the Wisconsin Supreme Court are nonpartisan, campaigns for the seats sometimes generate partisan fervor. As a result, elections have become expensive; over $4.3 million was spent in the 2016 race.

2020 primary election amid COVID-19 pandemic
In April 2020, amid the COVID-19 pandemic, the Wisconsin Supreme Court ruled (virtually, due to the pandemic) that Governor Tony Evers could not delay the state's 2020 primary elections, despite public fears of COVID-19.

Stay at home order
In May 2020, in response to a lawsuit brought by the Republican-led state legislature, the Court ruled 4–3 to strike down an order issued by Secretary-designate  of the  Department  of  Health  Services Andrea Palm, which extended the stay-at-home order previously issued by Governor Tony Evers. The portion of the order that kept all K-12 schools closed for the remainder of the school year remained in effect. The deciding vote to strike down the Secretary-designate's order was by Daniel Kelly, who had recently lost his bid for re-election to Jill Karofsky.

Elections
Justices are elected in nonpartisan elections for ten-year terms. Only one justice may be elected in any year. Justices are elected in the spring election, being the first Tuesday in April. If there are more than two candidates, a spring primary is held on the third Tuesday in February.

2018
Michael Gableman did not seek re-election in 2018. Two county judges, Rebecca Dallet and Michael Screnock, ran for the open seat. A third candidate, Tim Burns, did not make it to the general election in the February 20 primary. Dallet was elected in the April 3 general election.

2019
Incumbent Justice Shirley Abrahamson, who had served on the court for 42 years, did not seek re-election in 2019. Appeals Judge Brian Hagedorn was elected to succeed her in the April 2 general election over fellow Appeals Court Judge Lisa Neubauer, and took his seat on the court on August 1, 2019.

2020
On April 7, 2020, liberal Jill Karofsky defeated conservative incumbent Daniel Kelly as Justice of the Wisconsin Supreme Court. The election was  held during the coronavirus pandemic, forcing many voters to choose between voting by mail, waiting in long lines for hours, or not participating at all.

2023 

Patience Roggensack is not seeking re-election in 2023. Former Justice Daniel Kelly will face Judge Janet Protasiewicz on April 4, 2023. Judges Jennifer Dorow and Everett Mitchell also ran, but they were eliminated in the February 21 primary. This race has attracted widespread media attention, as it will determine the ideological balance of the court for at least the next two years. The outcome could determine how the court rules on future cases involving abortion rights, voting rights, and redistricting.

See also
 Wisconsin Court of Appeals
 Wisconsin Circuit Court
 State supreme court

Footnotes

Further reading
 Adelman, Lynn. How Big Money Ruined Public Life in Wisconsin, 66 Clev. St. L. Rev. 1 (2017).
 Ranney, Joseph A. Wisconsin and the Shaping of American Law. Madison, WI: University of Wisconsin Press, 2017.

External links
 Wisconsin Supreme Court website
 

 
1848 establishments in Wisconsin
Courts and tribunals established in 1848